Vice Admiral Andrew Paul Burns,  (born 20 November 1969) is a senior Royal Navy officer. He has served as Fleet Commander since September 2021.

Naval career
Educated at Portsmouth Grammar School, Sherborne School and Durham University (Hatfield College) (1989–1992), Burns joined the Royal Navy in 1992. He also holds an MA degree in Defence Studies from King's College London. He was given command of the minesweeper  in 2000 and, after being deployed to Iraq as a Director for Communications and Information Systems in 2004, he became commanding officer of the frigate  in 2009 and then of the assault ship  in 2012. He became Principal Staff Officer to the Commander Joint Forces Command in 2013, and Commander Amphibious Task Group in May 2016.

In February 2019, Burns was promoted to rear admiral, and appointed Commander United Kingdom Maritime Forces and Rear Admiral Surface Ships. He was appointed Assistant Chief of the Naval Staff (Capability) in January 2020 and was also given the title of Director Develop as of September 2020. He was promoted to vice admiral and took up the post of Fleet Commander in September 2021.

Honours

Burns was appointed Officer of the Order of the British Empire (OBE) in the 2015 Birthday Honours, and Companion of the Order of the Bath (CB) in the 2021 Birthday Honours.

References

|-

|-

1969 births
Living people
People educated at The Portsmouth Grammar School
People educated at Sherborne School
Alumni of Hatfield College, Durham
Alumni of King's College London
Royal Navy vice admirals
Companions of the Order of the Bath
Officers of the Order of the British Empire